Frosta is the administrative centre of Frosta municipality in Trøndelag county, Norway.

Name
The Old Norse form of the name was (also) Frosta.  The meaning of the name is unknown.  Historically, the name was also spelled Frosten.

References

Villages in Trøndelag
Frosta